CS Năvodari is a Romanian rugby union club based in Năvodari, Romania. It was founded in 2007 and is currently playing in the Liga Națională de Rugby. Before entering the new league format, Navodari won in 2019 the Romanian second tier league, the Divizia Nationala de Seniori.

References

External links
Liga Nationala de Rugby link

Romanian rugby union teams